is a former Japanese football player.

Playing career
Hashiguchi was born in Amagasaki on May 21, 1974. After graduating from Hannan University, he joined J1 League club Cerezo Osaka in 1997. He played many matches as left side back in 1998. However he could hardly play in the match in 1999. In 2000, he moved to Avispa Fukuoka. However he could hardly play in the match and retired end of 2000 season.

Club statistics

References

External links

1974 births
Living people
Hannan University alumni
Association football people from Hyōgo Prefecture
Japanese footballers
J1 League players
Cerezo Osaka players
Avispa Fukuoka players
Association football defenders